Hervarar saga ok Heiðreks (The Saga of Hervör and Heidrek) is a legendary saga from the 13th century combining matter from several older sagas in Germanic heroic legend. It tells of wars between the Goths and the Huns during the 4th century. The final part of the saga, which was likely composed separately from and later than the rest, is a source for Swedish medieval history.  

The saga may be most appreciated for its memorable imagery, as seen in a quotation from one of its translators, Nora Kershaw Chadwick, on the invasion of the Horde:

The text contains several poetic sections: the Hervararkviða, on Hervor's visit to her father's grave and her retrieval of the sword Tyrfing; another, the Hlöðskviða, on the battle between Goths and Huns; and a third, containing the riddles of Gestumblindi.

It has inspired later writers and derivative works, such as J. R. R. Tolkien when shaping his legends of Middle-earth. His son, Christopher Tolkien translated the work into English as The Saga of King Heidrek the Wise.

Description

Hervarar saga ok Heiðreks (The Saga of Hervör and Heidrek) is a legendary saga known from 13th- and 14th-century parchment sources, plus additional 17th-century paper manuscripts that complete the story.

Manuscripts

There are two main manuscript sources for the text, dating to the 14th and 15th centuries, often referred to as H and R, respectively.

H, the Hauksbók (AM 544) dates to  1325; R (MS 2845) dates to the 15th century; once held at the Danish Royal Library at Copenhagen, it is now held by the Stofnun Árna Magnússonar in Reykjavík. In its present, fragmentary state, H tells the story up to the end of Gestumblindi's second riddle, whereas R is truncated before the end of Ch. 12, that is within the poem on the battle of Goths and Huns.

There is a third version, often referred to as U, from a 17th-century paper manuscript (R 715) held at the University Library in Uppsala. The version is very garbled and includes corrections sourced from other sagas, including from the Rímur reworking of the same tale, the Hervarar Rímur. An additional 17th-century manuscript (AM 203fol) held at the Copenhagen University Library contains a copy of R, but it then continues with text from another unknown source, thought to share a common ancestor with U.

There are also copied versions that were written down in the late 17th century; whereas the two early versions are on parchment, these later versions are on paper. These include AM 192, AM 193, AM 202 k, AM 354 4to, AM 355 4to, and AM 359 a 4to. These 17th-century paper manuscripts are thought to add nothing to the texts already known from H and R, although they continue the story where the two older versions end and fill in lacunas. Two manuscripts, (AM 281 4to) and (AM 597b) help complete the 'H' (Hausbók) version, being copies.  used the 1694 text (AM 345) in preparing his edition of the saga.

There are significant differences between R and H: R misses the first chapter and some riddles, as well as having a different sequence from H. Scholarly opinion differs as to which presents the best form of the text. The least altered version is thought to be the 'R' text.

A slightly different version of the stemma has been reconstructed by Alaric Hall, from that originally proposed by Jón Helgason  - both propose a (lost) version from which both parchment and the paper versions descend.

Content and analysis
The saga tells the history of the family of Hervör and Heidrek over several generations. It begins with the mythic tale of Guthmund; then, the story turns to the sons of Arngrim, a Viking Age tale also told in the Hyndluljóð. Next, the tale tells of Hervor, daughter of Angantyr; then of Heithrik son of Hervor. At this point, the setting of the tale changes from to the Kingdom of the Goths to somewhere in Eastern Europe ( 4th–5th century); finally, the tale returns to the historically later date.  considers that the latter part of the tale involving the Huns and Goths has a origin separate from that of the earlier parts and, in actual chronological time, is actually taking place several centuries earlier.

All the different manuscripts show a similar pattern: (a maximum of) seven sections, four of which are verse.  identifies seven key events: 1. introduction with the forging of the magical sword Tyrgingr; 2. a holmganga (duel) between Örvar-Oddr and Hjálmarr, and Angantýr and his brothers, in which Angantýr is killed and buried with the sword; 3. (with the poem Hervarakviða) Hervör reviving her dead father Angantýr and retrieving Tyrgingr; 4. the tale of Heiðrekr son of Hervör, new wielder of Tyrfingr; 5. his killing following a riddle-contest (a gátur presented in poem form) with Óðinn; 6. war between Heiðrekr's sons Angantýr and Hlöðr (including the poem Hlöðskviða); and 7. an epilogue listing the kingly descendants of Angantýr. The sixth and final parts are partially lost or absent in manuscripts 'H' and 'R' but are found in the 17th-century paper manuscripts.

The common link throughout all the tales is the sword Tyrfing being passed down through the generations. This magical sword shares a common trope with some other mythological weapons in that, once it has been drawn, it cannot be sheathed until it has drawn blood. (e.g., see also Dáinsleif, or Bodvar Bjarki's sword in Hrolf Kraki's Saga)

There are three poems in the text, one romantic, one gnomic, one heroic. The gnomic The Riddles of Gestumblindi, is a good example of riddling from early Norse literature. The other two poems are considered very good examples of the type; one concerns the dialogue between Hervor and Angantyr at the barrows at Samso, while the other describes the battle between the Huns and the Goths.

In addition to attempts to understand the relationship between the events in the saga and real-world historical characters, events, and places (see § Historicity), the manuscripts and contents are also useful to research into the attitudes and cultures of the periods in which they were composed or written down. Hall thinks the text derives ultimately from oral tradition, not from the invention of an author.

 believes the poem Hervararkviða (or 'The Waking of Angantyr') was composed specifically for a narrative closely akin to the tale told in Heiðreks saga, as it is consistent in style and forms a consistent narrative link between the events in the tale.  considers it unequivocally older than the saga itself. The exact nature of the original underlying narrative for the poem is a matter of scholarly debate.

The section of the saga concerning Heidrek's disregard for his father's advice is common to a widely known family of tales (called by Knut Liestøl "The Good Counsels of the Father"). In general there are three counsels; in the saga, a set of three (1st, 2nd, and 6th) fit together. Tolkien proposes that after the counsels were introduced into the work, further counsels were added, further extending that theme through the saga.

The poem Hlöðskviða (or "Battle of the Goths and Huns") has numerous analogues that overlap in topical coverage; the oldest of these is thought to be the English Widsith. Some excerpts of the poetry in 'Heiðreks saga' also appear in variant forms in Örvar-Odd's saga (lines 97–9, 103-6), and the outline story appears in books 5 and 6 of the Gesta Danorum. There are also elemental plot similarities between the saga and Sturlaugs saga starfsama up to the point that a protagonist receives the magic sword from a female figure; Hall surmises that the two may share a narrative origin.  considers that the poem, though seemingly considerably altered over time, once formed part of a continuous poetic narrative that gave a complete description of the Goth-Hun conflict and that existed as a separate work.

Historicity of "The Battle of the Goths and Huns"

In the 17th century, when the Norse sagas became a subject of interest to scholars, they were initially taken as reasonably accurate depictions of historical events. Later, in the 19th and 20th centuries, scholars realized that they were not completely historically accurate.

Carl Christian Rafn  considered that the battle between Goths and Huns was a legendary retelling of the battle between the Gothic king Ostrogotha and the Gepid king Fastida, which was described by Jordanes in Ch. 17 of his history of the Goths. Richard Heinzel , in his analysis Über die Hervararsaga, suggested the battle described was the same as the Battle of the Catalaunian Plains (451 CE), identifying Angantyr as the Roman general Aetius and Hlothr as the Frankish Chlodio, with the incorporation of parts of the general Litorius, whereas the Vandal Geiseric is the prototype for Gizurr Grytingalithi.  proposed alternative attributions for the battles. One, recorded by Paul the Deacon, took place between the Langobards and the Vulgares Bulgars; in that battle, Agelmundus (Agelmund) was killed, and his sister (conflated with Hervor) is taken prisoner. In the other battle, the new Langobardian king Lamissio is victorious; Much conflates this battle with that the Goths and Huns. He also identifies the  battlefields to be north of the River Danube in the Carpathian Mountains, near modern-day Kraków.

In the latter half of the 19th century, Heinzel's theory was predominant and widely accepted. Later, Gustav Neckel and Gudmund Schütte further analyzed the textual and historical information. Neckel placed the events after the death of Attila (d. 453 CE) during the later Gepid-Hun conflicts, whereas Schütte identified either Heithrekr or Heathoric as transformations of the name of the Gepid king Ardaric. In the early 1900s, Henrik Schück and Richard Constant Boer both rejected Heinzel's attribution and the link with Attila. Schück split the legend of the strife between brothers from that of the Goth-Hun war, as well as their geographic locations, and identified both sites as being in southern Russia. Boer associated the Dunheithr with the Daugava River but placed the battle further north in central European Russia, in the Valdai Hills.

Further scholarship in the 20th century added more name and place attributions, with Otto von Friesen and Arwid Johannson returning to the western end of the Carpathians; Hermann Schnedier placing the Goths in the Black Sea area (Crimean Goths); and Niels Clausen Lukman reanalyzing the tale, not in the context of Jordanes' history but in that of Ammianus Marcellinus. Lukman shifted the date to 386 CE, when a mass migration of peoples under Odotheus (conflated with Hlothr) was destroyed by the Romans on the Danube; in his reconstruction Heithrekr is the visigothic Athanaric. In an analysis of parts of the tale,  identifies the place where Angantyr revenges his father's (Heithrekr) killing by slaves as being at the foot of the Carpathians, using linguistic analysis based on consonant shifts (see Grimm's Law) in the term "Harvath Mountains". The place Árheimar in Danparstathir  mentioned in association is unidentified, though "Danpar-" has been assumed to be some form of the river Dnieper. Similarities with the Battle of Nedao (454 CE) have also been noted.

It is a testimony to its great age that names appear in genuinely Germanic forms and not in any form remotely influenced by Latin. Names for Goths appear that ceased to be used after 390 CE, such as Grýting (cf. the Latin form Greutungi) and Tyrfing (cf. the Latin form Tervingi). The events take place where the Goths lived during the wars with the Huns. The Gothic capital Árheimar is located on the Dniepr (...á Danparstöðum á þeim bæ, er Árheimar heita...), King Heidrek dies in the Carpathians (...und Harvaða fjöllum), and the battle with the Huns takes place on the plains of the Danube (...á vígvöll á Dúnheiði í Dylgjudölum). The mythical Myrkviðr [Mirkwood] that separates the Goths from the Huns appears to correspond to the Maeotian marshes.

Synopsis

The saga deals with the sword Tyrfing and how it was forged and cursed by the dwarfs Dvalinn and Durin for king Svafrlami. Later, Svafrlami lost it to the berserker Arngrim of Bolmsö, who gave it to his son Angantyr. Angantyr died during a fight on Samsø against the Swedish hero Hjalmar, whose friend Orvar-Odd buried the cursed sword in a barrow with Angantyr's body. From the barrow, it was retrieved by Angantyr's daughter, the shieldmaiden Hervor, who summoned her dead father to claim her inheritance. Then the saga continues with Hervor and her son Heidrek, king of Reidgotaland. Heiðrekr was killed after a riddle contest with Óðinn. His sons Angantyr and Hlod waged a great battle over about their father's heritage. Hlod was aided by the Huns, but nonetheless Angantyr defeated and killed him.

In the end, the saga relates that Angantyr had a son, who was king of Reidgotaland for a long time. Heiðrekr's daughter Hildr was the mother of Halfdan the Valiant, who was the father of Ivar Vidfamne. After Vidfamne, there follows a list of Swedish kings, both real and semi-legendary, ending with Philip Halstensson. However, but this was probably composed separately from the rest of the saga and integrated into it in later redactions.

Other sources
Traditions appearing in the saga have also been preserved in several Scandinavian medieval ballads and rímur, i.e. the Danish Angelfyr og Helmer kamp, the Faroese Hjálmar og Angantýr, Arngrims synir, Gátu rima, and in the Swedish Kung Speleman. The Faroese ballad, Gátu ríma ('riddle poem') was collected in the 19th century; it is thought by some scholars to derive from the riddle-contest in the saga. Versions of the account of Arngrim, Orvar-Odd and Hjalmar also appear in Orvar-Odds saga and in Gesta Danorum. A key scene in the later medieval Ormars rímur, in which the hero awakens his father from the dead to retrieve his sword, was probably inspired by Hervararkviða. 

Several of the characters who appear in the part called Battle of the Goths and Huns have also been identified in Old English poem Widsith, such as Heiðrekr (Heaþoric), Sifka (Sifeca), Hlǫðr (Hliðe), and Angantýr (Incgenþeow).

Influence, legacy, and adaptions

Hickes' "The Waking of Angantyr"
At the beginning of the 18th century, George Hickes published a translation of the Hervararkviða in his Linguarum veterum septentrionalium thesaurus grammatico-criticus et archæologicus. Working from Verelius's 1671 translations , with the aid of a Swedish scholar, he presented the entire poem in half-line verse similar to that used in Old English poetry (see Old English metre). It was the first full Icelandic poem translated into English, and it aroused interest in England in such works. The work was reprinted in Dryden's Poetical Miscellanies (1716) and by Thomas Percy in amended form as "The Incantation of Hervor" in his Five Pieces of Runic Poetry (1763).

Hickes's publication inspired various "Gothic" and "Runic odes" based on the poem, of varying quality and faithfulness to the original.  states "[T]he cult of the ubiquitous eighteenth-century poem known as 'The Waking of Angantyr' can be traced directly to its door."

Other adaptions
Hjálmar's Death-Song was translated by W. Herbert in his Select Icelandic Poetry.

The French poet Charles-Marie-René Leconte de Lisle adapted the Hervararkviða in the poem  "L’Épée d’Angantyr" [Angantyr's Sword] in his Poèmes barbares.

J. R. R. Tolkien
There is much in this saga that readers of J. R. R. Tolkien's work will recognize, most importantly the riddle contest. There are, for instance, warriors similar to the Rohirrim, brave shieldmaidens, Mirkwood, haunted barrows yielding enchanted swords (see Barrow-downs), a mithril mailcoat, an epic battle, and two dwarves named Dwalin and Durin.

References

Manuscript facsimiles
 H, at f. 72v, the start of the saga
 R

Editions 

 

 

  
  , based on the R-text

Translations

English
  , e-text 
also alongside the Old Norse in :  Hervarar Saga og Heiðreks [The Saga of Hervör and Heithrek ] 

 
 

Other languages

Poems and poetic adaption

Bibliography

Sources

External links

Fiction set in the 4th century
13th-century literature
Legendary sagas
Sources of Norse mythology
Tyrfing cycle